Aquatics at the 2001 Southeast Asian Games included swimming, Synchronized swimming, diving and water polo events. The three sports of aquatics were held in Kuala Lumpur, Malaysia. Aquatics events was held between 10 September to 18 September.

Swimming
Men's events

Women's events

Synchronized swimming

Diving

Water polo

References

2001 Southeast Asian Games
2001
2001 in water sports